Lycée Français de Vienne ("French Lycée of Vienna") is a French curriculum secondary school in Alsergrund, Vienna.

The Lycée Français de Vienne is one of the world's largest schools accredited by the Agency for French Teaching Abroad (AEFE) and has more than 2000 students.
The private school shares its boarding school with Theresianum.
Furthermore, the school is currently renowned for its excellence.

Academic Results

French Baccalauréat
The Lycée Français de Vienne has the following results: 
Baccalauréat results 2015

 Percentage of honours "Mention Très Bien": 30% of the students.
 Percentage of honours "Mention Bien": 33% of the students.
 Percentage of honours "Mention Assez Bien": 20% of the students.
 Percentage of total honours : 83% of the students.

Notable alumni

 Timna Brauer
 Guillaume de Fondaumière
 Mark Kidel
 Arabella Kiesbauer
 Christoph Matznetter
 Julius Meinl
 Ariel Muzicant
 Marjane Satrapi
 Lisa Schettner
 Zoë Straub
 Toto Wolff

References

External links

 Lycée Français de Vienne 

International schools in Vienna
Vienna
Buildings and structures in Alsergrund
Educational institutions established in 1946
1946 establishments in Austria